These are lists of long-distance trails in the Republic of Ireland, and include recognised and maintained walking trails, pilgrim trails, cycling greenways, boardwalk-mountain trails, and interconnected national and international trail systems.

There are 43 National Waymarked Trails by the 'National Trails Office' of the Irish Sports Council. Each trail is waymarked with square black posts containing an image, in yellow, of a walking man and a directional arrow, a symbol reserved for use only by National Waymarked Trails. The most frequented trails are the Wicklow, Sheep's Head, Kerry, Dingle, Beara, Burren and Western Ways.

In 1997, the Heritage Council, started developing a series of walking routes based on medieval pilgrimage paths, and there are now  of major penitential trails: Cnoc na dTobar, Cosán na Naomh, St. Finbarr's Pilgrim Path, Saint Kevin's Way, and  Tochar Phádraig.  These pilgrim trails, and seven others, are supported by Pilgrim Paths of Ireland who follow the same guidelines for developing National Waymarked Trails.

In 2017, the 46-kilometre Waterford Greenway was opened for cyclists, and many others are planned or in development. Many of the National Waymarked Trails form part of larger long-distance and transnational trails such as European walking route E8, the Beara-Breifne Way and the International Appalachian Trail.

National waymarked trails

The establishment of the Ulster Way in Northern Ireland in the 1970s prompted the creation of the Cospóir Long Distance Walking Routes Committee (now the 'National Trails Advisory Committee' of the Irish Sports Council) to establish a national network of long-distance trails in the Republic of Ireland. The committee included An Taisce nominee J. B. Malone, who had done much to popularise walking through an Evening Herald newspaper column, television programmes and books. The first trail in the Republic – the Wicklow Way – was based on a series of articles Malone had written for the Evening Herald in 1966, and was opened in 1980; it was followed by the South Leinster and East Munster Ways in 1984; the Kerry Way and the Táin Way in 1985; and the Dingle and Slieve Bloom Ways in 1987.

The work of the committee was not supported by compulsory powers, and access had to be achieved by agreement with local authorities and private landowners, which was not usually forthcoming. Most of the trails are therefore dependent on access from by the state: Coillte, the state-owned forestry company, is the largest single manager of any of the trails with more than 30 National Waymarked Trails making use of its property. Coillte provides and maintains 52% of all off-road walking trails and 24% of the total amount of developed walking trails in Ireland. Access issues mean that many trails have substantial sections on public roads. Author John G. O'Dwyer summed up the situation of trails using long stretches on boring public roads interspersed with monotone Coillte Sitka spruce forests.

A 2006 National Trails Strategy, by the Irish Sports Council, noted that Irish trails fell well behind international standards, and that access was "the single most important" issue. A 2010 review of the National Waymarked Trails by the Irish Sports Council restated many of these issues and made recommendations on a new standard of trail called a 'National Long Distance Trail' (NLDT), intended to meet international standards for outstanding trails. Five trails – the Beara, Dingle, Kerry, Sheep's Head and Wicklow Ways – were recommended to be upgraded to NLDT.

Pilgrim paths

Influenced by the work of the Council of Europe on the Camino de Santiago de Compostela in the 1980s and 1990s, the Pilgrim Paths Project was set up by the Heritage Council as its Millennium Project in 1997. The purpose was to develop and support a network of walking routes along Irish medieval pilgrimage paths to raise awareness of natural and built heritage along these routes and to contribute to tourism and community development.

In 2013, Pilgrim Paths of Ireland (PPI) was set up as a non-denominational representative body for Ireland's medieval pilgrim paths, and represents 12 community groups supporting specific paths.  PPI holds and annual National Pilgrimage Paths Week during Easter, and issues a National Pilgrimage Passport to finishers of the 5 main trails: Cnoc na dTobar, Cosán na Naomh, St. Finbarr's Pilgrim Path, Saint Kevin's Way, and Tochar Phádraig.

The routes follow the guidelines for National Waymarked Trails, with black marker posts with a yellow pilgrim symbol; this image is based on a stone from a pilgrimage site in County Cork which depicts a pilgrim with a Celtic tonsure, wearing a tunic and carrying a staff. Beneath the symbol is a directional arrow inset with a cross of arcs, one of the main symbols of pilgrimage in Ireland.

Cycle greenways

, there were four greenways (mostly rail trails) in the Republic of Ireland:

A project has been initiated to create an  Connemara Greenway along the route of the former Galway to Clifden Midland Great Western Railway. The Dublin-Galway Greenway has also been initiated. The 280 km route was planned to be completed by 2020. Sections of the route follow the Royal Canal from Dublin, as well as the disused Mullingar-Athlone rail line. Funding was made available for the development of a greenway on the former Tralee to Fenit railway line in County Kerry, with (as of 2011) the development of further greenways under consideration in other parts of the country. There is also a campaign to create a greenway on the Claremorris, County Mayo to Collooney, County Sligo section of the Western Rail Corridor.

Boarded mountain paths

The Irish Office of Public Works (OPW) maintains a number of "boarded paths", often using railway sleepers, on some Irish mountains.

The driver of their creation has been to protect the underlying ground (often delicate bogland) from erosion by hill-walkers, however, in most cases, the creation of the paths has also materially increased the use and popularity of the paths by the public. When the Stairway to Heaven was opened in 2015, it was estimated that visitors to Cuilcagh Mountain increased from circa 3,000 per annum, to over 60,000 per annum.

, there are five boarded mountain paths (also called Tóchars by the NPWS) in Ireland:

 Cuilcagh "Stairway to Heaven" (Cavan/Fermanagh). A 7.5–kilometre boarded path to the summit of Cuilcagh mountain (e.g. a 15–kilometre round-trip), that was opened in 2015 to protect the underlying bog, but has since become a significant tourist attraction in the area.
 Diamond Hill. A 7–kilometre boarded and stone path round-trip trail that starts and ends at the National Park visitor centre in Letterfrack in Connemara.  The mountain was closed to climbing in 2002 due to severe erosion but was re-opened in December 2005 after the completion of a Euro 1.4 million wooden boardwalk and stone path trail to limit further erosion; since construction, only Croagh Patrick has a higher footfall in Connemara mountains.
 Djouce (Wicklow). A 4–kilometre boarded path consisting of railway sleepers was constructed during 1997–1999 to protect the underlying bog from erosion due to the popularity of the mountain hill walking; the path does not go all the way to the summit, and instead, a gravel-track is used.
 Glendalough "Spinc/White Trail" (Wicklow). An 8–kilometre "loop-route" on the mountains surrounding the Upper Glendalough Lake, that takes in the rocky The Spinc outcrop and associated views into the valley below.
 Torc Mountain (Kerry). A boarded path to the summit that enables hill-walkers to complete the longer 8–kilometre Torc Waterfall to Torc Mountain summit route without requiring any special mountain footwear or navigation skills.

Teresa Wall vs NPWS (2016) 
The future of boarded mountain paths and trails in Ireland was put in doubt when a climber, Teresa Wall, successfully sued the National Parks and Wildlife Service (NPWS) in the Circuit Court for €40,000 in 2016 for an injury sustained on the Djouce boarded walk (she required seven stitches after tripping on the boardwalk and cutting her knee near the J.B. Malone memorial stone); however, her award was overturned in February 2017 following a High Court appeal by the NPWS, which rejected her arguments that a "trip hazard" is the same whatever the location.

Interconnecting trails

National
Beara-Breifne Way is a walking and cycling route under development intended to run from the Beara Peninsula, Cork to Breifne, Leitrim following the line of Donal Cam O'Sullivan Beare's march in the aftermath of the Battle of Kinsale in 1602. The intended route will make use of the Beara Way; Ballyhoura Way; Suck Valley Way; Miner's Way and Historical Trail; Leitrim Way; and Cavan Way.

International
European walking route E8 is an international walking trail that extends from Dursey Island, County Cork to Istanbul in Turkey. In Ireland the E8 follows the Wicklow, South Leinster, East Munster and Blackwater Ways and parts of the Kerry and Beara Ways.

There is also a proposal to extend the International Appalachian Trail (IAT), an extension of the Appalachian Trail through Canada to Newfoundland, to all terrain that formed part of the Appalachian Mountains of Pangaea, including Ireland. It is proposed that the Irish leg of the IAT will make use of the Slí Colmcille and the Bluestack Way in County Donegal before joining the Ulster Way in Northern Ireland.

See also
 Bangor Trail
 Malin to Mizen
 Wild Atlantic Way
 Lists of mountains in Ireland
 List of mountains of the British Isles by height

Notes and references

Notes

References

Bibliography

External links
 National Waymarked Trails on Irishtrails.ie
 National Trails Office
 The Pilgrim Paths

Ireland
Irish Greenways